Acronicta australis is a species of moth in the family Noctuidae (the owlet moths). It is found in North America.

The MONA or Hodges number for Acronicta australis is 9275.1.

References

Further reading

 
 
 

Acronicta
Articles created by Qbugbot
Moths described in 2000